The Operators may refer to:

 The Operators (band), a British indie rock band
 The Operators (book), a 2012 non-fiction book by Michael Hastings 
 The Operators (film), or War Machine, a 2017 film based on the book